Hoseynabad-e Zand (also Romanized as Ḩoseynābād-e Zand; also known as Ḩoseynābād) is a village in Jafarabad Rural District, Jafarabad District, Qom County, Qom Province, Iran. At the 2006 census, its population was 159, in 37 families.

References 

Populated places in Qom Province